is a public university located in Miyagi Prefecture, Japan. Established in 1997, the university has currently two campuses in Miyagi prefecture, after merging with Miyagi Agricultural College in 2005. The university is often called "MYU" or "Miya-Dai" for an abbreviation.

History 
In 1997, Miyagi University was established in the town of Taiwa in Kurokawa District, Miyagi with a School of Nursing and School of Project Design. In 2001, the university established the Graduate School Programs for Nursing and Project Design.

Miyagi University’s policy is “We aim to be a university firmly rooted in the local community, but our doors and networks open to all over the globe”. Miyagi University is also about “Hospitality” and “Amenity”, where hospitality is being able to understand other people on an emotional level and amenity is keeping environments open in terms of a learning and living community.

Miyagi Agricultural College, a junior college located in Taihaku-ku, Sendai, was merged with Miyagi University in 2005, and the School of Food, Agricultural and Environmental Sciences was opened in the same year.

Faculties

Schools 
 School of Nursing
 School of Project Design
 School of Food, Agricultural and Environmental Sciences

Graduate Schools 
 Graduate School of Nursing
 Graduate School of Project Design

Institutions 
 International Center
 Regional Liaison Center

References

External links 

 Miyagi University Official Homepage 

Public universities in Japan
Sendai
Universities and colleges in Miyagi Prefecture
Educational institutions established in 1997
1997 establishments in Japan